Øystein Dahle (born 18 March 1938) is a former Norwegian businessperson and organizational leader.

He was born in Trondheim. He worked in Esso from 1963, and was vice president of Esso Norway from 1985 to 1995. He was the chairman of the Norwegian Trekking Association from 1994 to 2003, and in the Worldwatch Institute from 2002. He is a fellow of the Norwegian Academy of Technological Sciences.

He is the father of poet Gro Dahle (born 1962) and married to former civil servant Nina Frisak (born 1950).

References

1938 births
Living people
Norwegian businesspeople
People in the petroleum industry
Members of the Norwegian Academy of Technological Sciences
People from Trondheim